Hwango-dong is a dong or a neighbourhood of the Gyeongju City, North Gyeongsang province, South Korea. It is located in the central Gyeongju and is bordered by Bohwang-dong on the east, Jangang-dong on the west, Hwangnam-dong on the south and Seongdong-dong on the north. Its 1.5 square kilometers are home to about 10225 people. It is both an administrative dong and legal dong.

The city's main railway station was located in the district. Hwango-dong has a middle school and a high school.

See also
Subdivisions of Gyeongju
Administrative divisions of South Korea

References

External links
 The official site of the Hwango-dong office

Subdivisions of Gyeongju
Neighbourhoods in South Korea